Carposina benigna is a moth of the family Carposinidae. It was first described by Edward Meyrick in 1913. It is endemic to the Hawaiian island of Oahu.

References

Carposinidae
Endemic moths of Hawaii